United States were scheduled to compete at the 2017 World Aquatics Championships in Budapest, Hungary from 14 July to 30 July.

Medalists

Diving

United States has entered 16 divers (nine male and seven female).

Men

Women

Mixed

High diving

United States qualified three male and three female high divers.

Open water swimming

The United States has entered ten open water swimmers

Swimming

U.S. swimmers have achieved qualifying standards in the following events (up to a maximum of 2 swimmers in each event at the A-standard entry time, and 1 at the B-standard):

The U.S. team consists of 45 swimmers (24 men and 21 women).

Men

Women

Mixed

Synchronized swimming

United States' synchronized swimming team consisted of 13 athletes (1 male and 12 female).

Women

Mixed

 Legend: (R) = Reserve Athlete

Water polo

The United States qualified both a men's and women's teams.

Men's tournament

Team roster

McQuin Baron
Johnathan Hooper
Marko Vavic
Alex Obert (C)
Ben Hallock
Luca Cupido
Thomas Dunstan
Nick Carniglia
Alex Bowen
Chancellor Ramirez
Alex Roelse
Maxwell Irving
Drew Holland

Group play

13th–16th place semifinals

13th place game

Women's tournament

Team roster

Gabrielle Stone
Madeline Musselman
Melissa Seidemann
Rachel Fattal
Paige Hauschild
Margaret Steffens (C)
Jordan Raney
Kiley Neushul
Aria Fischer
Jamie Neushul
Makenzie Fischer
Alys Williams
Amanda Longan

Group play

Quarterfinals

Semifinals

Final

References

Nations at the 2017 World Aquatics Championships
United States at the World Aquatics Championships
2017 in American sports